Shall Woman Preach may refer to:
 Shall Woman Preach, an 1891 book by Louisa Mariah Layman Woosley
 Shall Woman Preach, a 1905 book by William Harvey